Mount Deryugin is a mountain,  high, on Vindegga Spur in the Liebknecht Range, Humboldt Mountains, in Queen Maud Land. It was discovered and plotted from air photos by the Third German Antarctic Expedition, 1938–39. It was mapped from air photos and surveys by the Sixth Norwegian Antarctic Expedition, 1956–60, remapped by the Soviet Antarctic Expedition, 1960–61, and named after Soviet zoologist K.M. Deryugin.

References

Mountains of Queen Maud Land
Humboldt Mountains (Antarctica)